These hits topped the Ultratop 50 in 2008.

See also
2008 in music

Notes

 Belgian entry to the 2008 Eurovision Song Contest

References

Ultratop 50
Belgium Ultratop 50
2008